Maieta is a genus of flowering plants belonging to the family Melastomataceae.

Its native range is Southern Tropical America.

Species:

Maieta neblinensis 
Maieta poeppigii

References

Melastomataceae
Melastomataceae genera